Kirchdorf is a Samtgemeinde ("collective municipality") in the district of Diepholz, in Lower Saxony, Germany. Its seat is in Kirchdorf.

The Samtgemeinde Kirchdorf consists of the following municipalities:

 Bahrenborstel 
 Barenburg
 Freistatt 
 Kirchdorf 
 Varrel 
 Wehrbleck

Samtgemeinden in Lower Saxony